The Northern Indiana Valley Conference was an Indiana High School Athletic Association sanctioned conference in the South Bend/Mishawaka metropolitan area. The conference began as the St. Joseph County Conference in 1932, made up of county schools and South Bend schools not in the Northern Indiana Conference. Smaller county schools consolidated and moved to different conferences with schools of similar size, and by 1966 the county league was down to four members. The league decided to take in the two county Catholic schools, Marian and St. Joseph the next year, and rebranded as the Northern Indiana Valley Conference. The league took a hard hits beginning in 1974. Clay became an Independent (until 1978). Penn was accepted into the Northern Indiana Athletic Conference, South Bend Jackson announced its closure after the school year, and the league stopped sponsoring football. South Bend LaSalle were invited to replace LaPorte in the Northern Indiana Athletic Conference in 1976, although like Penn, they played in both leagues where schedules permitted. However, when Clay joined the Northern Indiana Athletic Conference in 1978, the schools broke off their relationship with the Catholic schools. Marian and St. Joseph continued on as independents for the next 27 years. With LaSalle closing in 2002, the Northern Indiana Athletic Conference discussed expanding beyond its seven schools, and took on both of the Catholic schools in 2005, so they absorbed every school in the Northern Indiana Valley Conference.

Membership
All schools located in St. Joseph County.

 Was Washington-Clay until 1963
 Concurrent in Northern Indiana Valley Conference and Northern Indiana Athletic Conference, 1974–78.
 Concurrent in Northern Indiana Valley Conference and Northern Indiana Athletic Conference, 1976–78.

Conference Champions (Football)
1967 - Mishawaka Marian (5-0)
1968 - South Bend St. Joseph's (4-1)
1969 - Mishawaka Marian (5-0)
1970 - Mishawaka Marian (5-0)
1971 - Mishawaka Marian (5-0)
1972 - South Bend St. Joseph's (5-0)
1973 - South Bend St. Joseph's (5-0)

Related links
 Northern Indiana Football History
 Indiana High School Athletic Association
 List of high school athletic conferences in Indiana
 Indiana big school football champions

Indiana high school athletic conferences
Indiana High School Athletic Association disestablished conferences